Fancy Farm may refer to:

Fancy Farm, Kentucky, a census-designated place
Fancy Farm (Bedford, Virginia), a plantation home on the National Register of Historic Places

See also
Fancy's Family Farm, a community farm and tourist attraction in Dorset, England